The men's 400 metres was a track & field athletics event at the 1900 Summer Olympics in Paris. It was held on July 14, and July 15, 1900. The races were held on a track of 500 metres in circumference. 15 athletes from six nations competed.

Background

This was the second time the event was held. None of the runners from 1896 returned. Maxie Long of the United States was favored, as 1898 and 1899 AAU champion and 1900 AAA champion. His countryman Dixon Boardman was a strong challenger, having beaten Long at the 1900 IC4A.

The United States and France made their second appearances in the event; Denmark, Hungary, Italy, and Norway made their debuts.

Competition format

There were two rounds: heats and a final. The top 2 runners in each heat advanced to the final.

Records

These were the standing world and Olympic records (in seconds) prior to the 1900 Summer Olympics.

(*) unofficial 440 yards (= 402.34 m)

Maxie Long set a new Olympic record in the first round with 50.4 seconds. In the final he improved his own record when he ran 49.4 seconds.

Schedule

All times are Central European Time (UTC+1)

Results

Semifinals

In the first round, there were three heats. They were held on July 14. The top two runners in each advanced to the final.

Semifinal 1

This heat, featuring four American runners, resulted in an easy win for Long and the top three spots for the United States team.

Semifinal 2

Again, an American won the heat easily. Schulz took second place to qualify for the final.

Semifinal 3

The United States runners again took all three of the top spots in this heat.

Final

Boardman, Lee, and Moloney withdrew because the final was held on a Sunday. Long and Holland did start, however, and Long led the entire way to win by five yards, with Schultz 20 yards behind the Americans.

Results summary

Sources

 International Olympic Committee.
 De Wael, Herman. Herman's Full Olympians: "Athletics 1900". Accessed 18 March 2006.
 

Men's 0400 metres
400 metres at the Olympics